Tiago Cação (born 28 February 1998) is a Portuguese tennis player.

Cação has a career high ATP singles ranking of 394 achieved on 17 December 2018. He also has a career high ATP doubles ranking of 469 achieved on 1 October 2018.

Cação made his ATP main draw debut at the 2019 Estoril Open in the doubles draw partnering Fred Gil.

Future and Challenger finals

Singles: 4 (0–4)

References

External links
 
 

1998 births
Living people
Portuguese male tennis players
21st-century Portuguese people